Kenneth Joseph Holley (October 9, 1919 – March 1, 1986) was an American football quarterback.

Holley was born in Hartford, Connecticut, in 1919 and attended St. John's Prep. He played college football at Holy Cross. He served in the Army during World War II and was the quarterback on the undefeated 1944 Randolph Field Ramblers football team that won the Treasury Bond Bowl and was ranked No. 3 in the final AP Poll. In 1945, he played for the ATC Rockets in the Air Force League.

After the war, Holley played professional football for the Miami Seahawks of the All-America Football Conference in 1946.  He appeared in five games for the Seahawks. 

He died in 1986 in Livingston, New Jersey.

References

1919 births
1986 deaths
American football quarterbacks
Miami Seahawks players
Randolph Field Ramblers football players
Holy Cross Crusaders football players
Players of American football from Hartford, Connecticut
United States Army personnel of World War II